Judith Carr may refer to:

 Judith Feld Carr, Canadian musician and humanitarian, who smuggled over three thousand Syrian Jews out of Syria
 Juliet Anderson, born Judith Carr, American pornographic actress and film producer, often better known as "Aunt Peg"
 Judith Carr (politician), former member of the Ohio House of Representatives